Susan Schulz has been the editor-in-chief of CosmoGIRL! magazine since July 2003. She is no longer the editor-in-chief because the CosmoGirl! print magazine has been shut down by Hearst. However, she has been reassigned to special projects at the company. As of 2010, she has been given the job of Editorial Brand Manager for Cosmopolitan magazine.

References

1971 births
Living people
Fashion editors